Edward Joseph Boling (February 19, 1922 – June 18, 2015) was an American academic. He served as the first president of University of Tennessee system from 1970 to 1988.

Thompson-Boling Arena, the basketball stadium used by the Vols and Lady Vols at the University of Tennessee-Knoxville, is partly named after him.

References

1922 births
2015 deaths
Presidents of the University of Tennessee system